Anatoly Andreyevich Gromyko (15 April 1932 – 25 September 2017) was a Soviet and Russian scientist and diplomat. He specialized in American and African studies as well as international relations, and was a member of the Russian Academy of Sciences and the Union of Russian Artists.

Biography
Gromyko was born in Barysaw, in the Byelorussian SSR of the Soviet Union, in 1932, and between 1939 and 1948 lived in the United States, where his father Andrei Gromyko worked as the Soviet ambassador and representative in the United Nations. In 1954, he graduated from the Moscow State Institute of International Relations, and between 1961 and 1965 worked at the Soviet Embassy to the United Kingdom. After that he took leading positions at the Institute for African Studies and Institute for US and Canadian Studies of the Russian Academy of Sciences. He then returned to diplomacy and acted as the Soviet deputy ambassador in the United States (1973–1974) and East Germany (1974–1975). Between 1976 and 1991, he headed the Institute for African Studies, where he continued working until 2010. From 2010 on, he lectured at the Institute of International Security and at the Moscow State University. In 1981, he was elected to the Russian Academy of Sciences where he curated African studies. 

Gromyko co-authored more than 30 books and more than 300 journal articles. He was awarded the Order of the October Revolution, Order of Friendship of Peoples and USSR State Prize (1980).

Family
Gromyko was married twice, second time to Valentina Olegovna Gromyko. He has two sons from different marriages, Igor (born 1954) and Aleksei (born 1969), as well as a daughter, Anna. Igor is a diplomat, whereas Alexei is a political scientist.

References

External links

 African Countries' Foreign Policy, 1983, edited by Anatoly Gromyko.

1932 births
2017 deaths
People from Barysaw
Soviet Africanists
Russian Africanists
Soviet diplomats
Soviet economists
20th-century  Russian economists
Soviet historians
20th-century Russian historians
Moscow State Institute of International Relations alumni
Corresponding Members of the USSR Academy of Sciences
Corresponding Members of the Russian Academy of Sciences
Recipients of the USSR State Prize
Recipients of the Order of Friendship of Peoples
21st-century Russian historians